The Quebec Provincial Hockey Championship (French:  Championnats Provinciaux de Hockey, known as Coupe Dodge, or the Dodge Cup for commercial reasons) is a provincial championship in the men's and women's amateur ice hockey leagues in Quebec, Canada. This tournament is sanctioned by both Fédération québécoise de hockey sur glace (Hockey Quebec) and Hockey Canada.

History
The first provincial championships organized by Hockey Quebec were presented at Montreal in 1978.  The name of the trophy has changed over the years because of sponsorship:  Daoust (1978-85), Purlator (1986-88), Chrysler (1989-2002), and since 2003, the Dodge brand. This tournament that determines the top double letter teams ("AA" ) at each level for boys and girls (U7, U9. U11, U13, U15, U18, U21) within the province of Quebec. Generally, the Quebec Provincial Championship extends over four or five days in April of every year.

Men's Provincial Championship
The Dodge Cup is the Quebec Provincial Championship for all age levels represented for U-21 (previously known as Junior B, or "Junior AA" in Quebec) hockey in Canada.  Similar provincial championships exist in Ontario (Sutherland Cup), Western Canada (Keystone Cup), Eastern Ontario (Barkley Cup), and Atlantic Canada (Don Johnson Memorial Cup)—leaving five teams at the end of each year with a shared claim to being the best Junior B team in Canada.

The U-21 "AA" championships began in 1988. In 2006, Hockey Quebec allowed for the Shawville Pontiacs and the Gatineau Mustangs of the Eastern Ontario Junior B Hockey League to take part in the event, even though they compete in a league based in Ontario. In 2008, Hockey Quebec allowed for two regional champions to share the Dodge Cup.

List of U21 "AA" (or B in other parts of Canada) Provincial Champions
In Québec, the U-21 "AA" classification is the equivalent of Junior "B" in the rest of Canada. The 2008 year marked a decision by Hockey Quebec to allow two separate tournaments with two separate champions.

Women's Provincial Championship

History
In 2008, the first Provincial Championship for women was added.  

 U-11 (9–10 years )
 U-13 (11–12 years)
 U-15 (13–14 years)
 U-18 (15-16-17 years)
 U-21 (18-19-20-21 years)

In 2007, the Dodge Cup has 60 women's teams quarrel the competition during 11–15 April: U-13 AA 6 teams, U-13 A 10 teams, U-15 AA 8 teams, U-15 A 8 teams, U-18 AA 8 teams, U-18 A 10 teams and finally U-21 A 10 teams. Since 2008 the women's Dodge Cup is held at a different venue and date than the men's competition.

Tournaments

2008
The historic first presentation of the women's provincial championships took place in 2008. The women's and men's championships both took place in the Saguenay–Lac-Saint-Jean and Côte-Nord regions during 9–13 April 2008. A total of 66 women's teams competed for the championship: Pee-wee AA 8 teams, Pee-wee A 10 teams, Bantam AA 10 teams, Bantam A 8 teams, Midget AA 10 teams, Midget A 12 teams and finally Junior A 8 teams:
 Pee-wee AA , played at Aréna Luc & Marie-Claude, in La Malbaie.
 Pee-wee A , contested at Aréna de Donnacona, in Donnacona.
 Bantam AA , competed at Aréna Luc & Marie-Claude, in La Malbaie.
 Bantam A , participated at Aréna de Donnacona, in Donnacona.
 Midget AA  and Midget A , played at Centre récréatif St-Félicien, in St-Félicien.
 Junior A , played at Aréna de Mashteuiatsh, in Mashteuiatsh.

: The Champions 2008

2009
The 2009 edition of the women's provincial championship took place in the Lake Saint Louis region from 8–12 April 2009: 66 women's teams competed in 7 different categories :Pee Wee A 8 teams, Pee Wee AA 8 teams, Bantam A 8 teams, Bantam AA 12 teams, Midget A 8 teams, Midget AA 12 teams and Junior A 10 teams. In addition, it was the first presence of four semifinalist teams that came from the Quebec women collegial league (Ligue de hockey féminin collégial AA).

: The Champions 2009

2010
The 2010 Provincial Championship was held from 31 March to 4 April 2010. The women's championship was from 7 to 11 April: the events from the Coupe Dodge were held in the region of Estrie. The organizing committee selected five cities as hosts for the women's competition. The event, which featured approximately 2000 female players, featured a total of 223 matches. In addition, the 2010 edition of the Cup gave way to some novelties, of which there was a Skills Challenge exclusively featuring women. Said challenge served to indicate the best player as well as the best goalkeeper in terms of skill. Finally we attended the semi-finals and the final of women college ice hockey (Ligue de hockey féminin collégial AA).

: The Champions 2010

2011

The competition was held from 31 March to 3 April in Montreal. For the first time in the four year existence of the women's Provincial Championship, the women's tournament will be contested in a city different from the men's competition: 118 women's teams (1775 girls playing ) in 14 category.

 Atom A, played at Centre Étienne Desmarteau
 Atom B, played at Aréna Henri-Bourassa
 Pee-wee AA, played at Aréna Michel-Normandin
 Pee-wee A, played at Centre Étienne Desmarteau
 Pee-wee B, played at Aréna Bill Burnan
 Bantam AA, played at Aréna Chaumont
 Bantam A, played at Aréna Michel-Normandin
 Bantam B , played at Aréna Chaumont
 Midget AA , played at Aréna St-Louis
 Midget A , played at Centre Étienne Desmarteau
 Midget B , played at Aréna Bill Burnan
 Junior A , played at Aréna Chaumont
 Junior B , played at Aréna Chaumont
 Collegiate AA , played at Centre Étienne Desmarteau

The finals of four championship categories(besides the semi-finals and the finals of Ligue de hockey féminin collégial AA) was presented at the Centre Étienne Desmarteau.

: The Champions 2011

2012
The women's Provincial Championships were held from 12 till 15 April 2012 to Laval. More than 200 girls' ice hockey teams from 14 regions of Quebec will come to conclude the 2011-12 regular season and to determine champions in the various categories.

Because of a change by the Quebec Student Sports Federation, the collegiate division was now labeled by RSEQ, the French title for the governing body of collegiate sports in the province.

The tournaments were held in seven venues in Laval, and five in Montréal:
 Atom A,
 Atom B,
 Pee-wee AA,
 Pee-wee A,
 Pee-wee B,
 Bantam AA,
 Bantam A,
 Bantam B ,
 Midget AA ,
 Midget A ,
 Midget B ,
 Junior AA.
 Junior A ,
 Junior B
 Collegiate RSEQ ,

: The Champions 2012

References

External links
 (French) Quebec Provincial Hockey Championships Website
 Quebec Provincial Hockey Championships results and Statistics
 (French) Hockey Québec: Federation ice hockey 

Ice hockey competitions in Quebec
Ice hockey tournaments in Canada
Canadian ice hockey trophies and awards
Women's ice hockey tournaments
Youth ice hockey in Canada
Quebec awards
Hockey Quebec